iBilib is a Philippine television informative show broadcast by GMA Network. Hosted by Chris Tiu and Moymoy Palaboy, it premiered on January 29, 2012.

Premise
The show features scientific experiments and showcases scientific facts and theories surrounding everyday events presented in a similar manner as seen on Japan's science television show Wonders of Horus.

Hosts

 Chris Tiu
 Moymoy Palaboy

Recurring hosts
 Angel Guardian
 Chariz Solomon
 Joyce Ching
 Ayra Mariano
 Jan Manual
 Ashley Ortega
 Heart Evangelista
 Alodia Gosiengfiao
 Solenn Heussaff
 Devon Seron 
 Kyline Alcantara 
 Therese Malvar 
 Thea Tolentino
 Isabelle Daza
 Shaira Diaz

Production
Principal photography was halted in March 2020 due to the enhanced community quarantine in Luzon caused by the COVID-19 pandemic. The show resumed its programming on September 27, 2020.

Ratings
According to AGB Nielsen Philippines' Mega Manila household television ratings, the pilot episode of iBilib earned a 19% rating.

Accolades

References

External links
 
 

2012 Philippine television series debuts
Filipino-language television shows
GMA Network original programming
Philippine television shows
Television productions suspended due to the COVID-19 pandemic